Cool Boarders 4 is a snowboarding video game developed by Idol Minds for the PlayStation.

In the game, the player can play multiple tracks with multiple characters. The campaign includes scenarios such as slalom runs and time attacks. In the game, the feature of multiplayer is also accessible.

Reception

The game received average reviews according to the review aggregation website GameRankings. Chris Kramer of NextGen said that the game "still lacks energy, and even Nintendo's three-year old 1080° Snowboarding is a better game." In Japan, where the game was ported and published by UEP Systems on March 9, 2000, Famitsu gave it a score of 28 out of 40.

References

External links
 

1999 video games
Deck Nine games
Multiplayer and single-player video games
PlayStation (console) games
PlayStation (console)-only games
Snowboarding video games
Video game sequels
Video games developed in the United States
UEP Systems games